Thomas Cody Spencer (born June 1, 1981) is a former NFL linebacker.  He was drafted by the Oakland Raiders in the sixth round of the 2004 NFL Draft. He played college football at  The University of North Texas. He won two State championships at Grapevine high school. 

Spencer has also played for the Tennessee Titans and New York Jets.

Early years
Three-year starter for North Texas and two-time all-conference first-team selection.

■ Three-time winner of Byron Gross Award, presented to team’s outstanding LB, who started 33 of 41 games during college career and totaled 297 tackles (154 solos), seven sacks, 22 TFL, two FR, one FF, seven INTs and eight PDs.

■ As senior, led Mean Green with 121 tackles and added two sacks, five TFL and three PD en route to earning All-Sun Belt Conference honors.

■ As junior, earned all-conference first-team honors despite missing nearly four games with injury, totaling 66 tackles, three INTs, and five sacks.

■ Limited to ST duties as UNT freshman before earning starting job at strongside LB as sophomore, then shifting to MLB as junior.

■ Attended Grapevine (TX) HS, where he was named all-district first-teamer at TE as junior when Grapevine won Class 4A Division I title, and all-district second-teamer at OLB as senior. 

OFF THE FIELD

■ Majored in applied arts.

■ Most summers as a youth, Spencer spent time on Gulf of Mexico, working with grandfather, George Spencer, on shrimping boat based out of Seadrift, TX.

■ Older brother Jeremy is member of U.S. Army and is now serving third term in Iraq.

■ He, wife, Kristin, and son, Gage, split time between Nashville, TN, and Grapevine, TX.

■ Has interest in coaching after playing career.

■ Enjoys hunting and fishing in spare time.

Spencer attended Grapevine High School in Grapevine, Texas. State Champs '96/'98

Coaching career
After leaving the NFL, he accepted the job at Texas High School in Texarkana, Texas.  He coached there from 2010-2014. Served as the Special Teams coordinator and Defensive coordinator.

Post Football Career
After the 2014 season, he moved back to his home area to work as a fishing guide. Following guiding he got a better opportunity and a life long dream and now runs a 72ft Viking sport fisher.

References

External links
Detroit Lions bio

1981 births
Living people
Players of American football from Texas
American football linebackers
North Texas Mean Green football players
Oakland Raiders players
Tennessee Titans players
New York Jets players
Detroit Lions players
People from Port Lavaca, Texas